Mitogen-activated protein kinase kinase kinase 7-interacting protein 1 is an enzyme that in humans is encoded by the TAB1 gene.

Function 

The protein encoded by this gene was identified as a regulator of the MAP kinase kinase kinase MAP3K7/TAK1, which is known to mediate various intracellular signaling pathways, such as those induced by TGF-beta, interleukin-1, and WNT-1. This protein interacts and thus activates TAK1 kinase. It has been shown that the C-terminal portion of this protein is sufficient for binding and activation of TAK1, while a portion of the N-terminus acts as a dominant-negative inhibitor of TGF beta, suggesting that this protein may function as a mediator between TGF beta receptors and TAK1. This protein can also interact with and activate the mitogen-activated protein kinase 14 (MAPK14/p38alpha), and thus represents an alternative activation pathway, in addition to the MAPKK pathways, which contributes to the biological responses of MAPK14 to various stimuli. Alternatively spliced transcript variants encoding distinct isoforms have been reported.  TAB1 contains multiple amino acid sites that are phosphorylated and ubiquitinated.

This protein plays an important role in skin homeostasis, wound repair, and oncogenesis.

Interactions 

TAB1 has been shown to interact with:

 MAP3K7IP2, 
 MAP3K7IP3,
 MAP3K7, 
 MAP3K1,
 MAPK14, 
 Mothers against decapentaplegic homolog 7, 
 TRAF6, 
 XIAP,  and
 ZMYND11.

References

Further reading